Mickaël Toti (born April 11, 1987 in Ivry-sur-Seine, France) is a French basketball player who played for French Pro A league clubs Reims, Clermont and Rouen from 2003–2009.

References

French men's basketball players
1987 births
Living people
Nanterre 92 players
People from Ivry-sur-Seine
Sportspeople from Val-de-Marne
21st-century French people